Lamyctes emarginatus is a species of centipede in the Henicopidae family. It was first described in 1844 by British entomologist George Newport.

Distribution
The species has been recorded from a geographically widespread suite of sites, including Africa, Europe, Australasia, Greenland and the Galapagos Islands. The type locality is New Zealand.

Behaviour
The centipedes are solitary terrestrial predators that inhabit plant litter and soil.

References

 

 
emarginatus
Centipedes of Australia
Arthropods of Africa
Myriapods of Europe
Fauna of New Caledonia
Animals described in 1844
Taxa named by George Newport